Foster Sylvers  is the third album by Foster Sylvers from the R&B group The Sylvers. This is his second self-titled album. It was released in 1978 and produced by The Sylvers, Al Ross and Bob Cullen. The arrangements were by David Crawford and Jerry Peters; with the percussion arranged by Harvey Mason and King Errisson.

Track listing
"Knocking At Your Door"
"Don't Let Me Go For Someone Else"
"Don't Be Cruel"
"Super Scoop"
"I'll See You In My Dreams"
"Goody Goody"
"Happy"
"The Drop"
"Sugarland"
"I'll Miss You"

Personnel
 The Sylvers – backing vocals
 Leon Sylvers III – bass
 Ed Greene – drums
 Ricky Sylvers – guitar
 Sylvester Rivers – piano
 Richard Tee – piano, organ
 Victor Feldman – vibraphone, percussion

External links
 Foster Sylvers – Foster Sylvers (1978) at Discogs

1978 albums
Foster Sylvers albums
Capitol Records albums